Toelgyfaloca is a genus of moths belonging to the subfamily Thyatirinae of the Drepanidae.

Species
 Toelgyfaloca albogrisea (Mell, 1942)
 Toelgyfaloca circumdata Houlbert, 1921

References

 , 2007, Esperiana Buchreihe zur Entomologie Band 13: 1-683 

Thyatirinae
Drepanidae genera